Edward Fenton McGlachlin, Sr., (December 19, 1840April 22, 1931) was an American newspaper editor and Republican politician.  He served one term in the Wisconsin State Assembly, representing Portage County.  During the American Civil War he served in the Union Army and was taken prisoner at the Battle of Chickamauga.  His son, Edward McGlachlin, Jr., was a distinguished U.S. Army officer and rose to the rank of major general.

Biography

Born in the town of Watson, Lewis County, New York, McGlachlin settled on a farm in Sheboygan County, Wisconsin, in 1857. In 1859, McGlachlin started working as a printer for the Fond du Lac Commonwealth newspaper in Fond du Lac, Wisconsin. During the American Civil War, McGlachlin served in the 1st Wisconsin Infantry Regiment and was promoted to sergeant. After the civil war, McGlachlin worked in the newspaper business in Fond du Lac, Wisconsin, Clinton, Iowa, and Oshkosh, Wisconsin. In 1873, McGlachlin moved to Stevens Point, Wisconsin, and was one of the editors and publishers of the Stevens Point Journal newspaper. In 1885, McGlachlin served on the Stevens Point Board of Education and was the board treasurer. In 1889, McGlachlin served in the Wisconsin State Assembly and was a Republican. He also served as postmaster and on the board of managers for the Grand Army Home for Veterans near Waupaca, Wisconsin. McGlachlin died at his home in Stevens Point, Wisconsin.

References

1840 births
1931 deaths
People from Lewis County, New York
People from Stevens Point, Wisconsin
People of Wisconsin in the American Civil War
Union Army soldiers
Editors of Wisconsin newspapers
Farmers from Wisconsin
School board members in Wisconsin
Journalists from New York (state)
Republican Party members of the Wisconsin State Assembly